Charles Carroll may refer to: 
Charles Carroll the Settler (1661–1720), wealthy early Maryland planter and lawyer, father of Charles Carroll of Annapolis
Charles Carroll of Annapolis (1702–1782), wealthy Maryland Catholic planter, son of Carroll the Settler and father of Carroll of Carrollton
Charles Carroll (barrister) (1723–1783), Continental Congressman from Maryland
Charles Carroll of Carrollton (1737–1832), signer of U.S. Declaration of Independence for Maryland and son of Charles Carroll of Annapolis
Charles H. Carroll (1794–1865), U.S. Congressman for New York
Charles Carroll (1865–1921), member of New York Society during the Gilded Age
Charles J. Carroll (1882–1942), American lawyer and politician
Charles Carroll (British Army officer) (1923–1992), British soldier of the Brigade of Gurkhas, Second World War

Chuck Carroll (1906–2003), American football player

See also
Charles Carroll Middle School, a middle school in New Carrollton, Maryland, named after the famous politician
Charles Carrollo (1902–1979), Kansas City, Missouri crime boss
Charles Carroll High School, a high school in Philadelphia Pennsylvania, named after a famous historical figure